Heresy: Kingdom Come is an out-of-print collectible card game (CCG) developed and published by Last Unicorn Games (LUG) in September 1995. The game was based on religion-themed fantasy in a cyberpunk setting.

Publication history

The base set, released in 1995, consisted of 374 cards. An expansion called Project Demiurge with 90 cards was planned for a June 1996 release, but as a result of poor sales, no expansion sets were ever published. The company delayed the release dependent upon "sufficient orders from distributors."

Setting
The theme of Heresy was the continuation of the War in Heaven between angels and demons in a futuristic cyberpunk setting. The premise is that the barriers (known in the game as the Mirror, Shroud, or Veil) between the physical realm (the Wilds), the digital realm (the Matrix), and the spiritual realm (Heaven) have grown thin, and fallen angels on Earth are trying to use the Matrix (cyberspace) to open a portal to ascend back into Heaven. Meanwhile, Earth is torn by conflict between not just the aforementioned angels and demons, but also human governments, corporations, criminal organizations, artificial intelligences, hackers, and cybernetically-enhanced humans.

Gameplay
Players alternate turns. Each type of card is associated with one of eight convictions: Acquisition, Devotion, Evolution, Preservation, Rebellion, Stagnation, Technology, and Tradition. There are six types of cards:

 Location cards can be turned sideways to generate either aura or tau:
 Aura is always associated with one of the eight convictions, and it is used to play non-Location cards of the same conviction.
 Tau is collected to make progress toward winning the game.
 Character cards represent individuals. They remain on the board after being played and can engage in combat.
 Aleph cards represent artifacts. Like characters, alephs remain on the board after being played.
 Enhancement cards attach to other cards, most often characters, for various effects.
 Celestial Power cards are one-time effects. They can only be played during the player's turn and are discarded after being played.
 Miracle cards are one-time effects like celestial powers, but can be played at any time, not just during the player's turn.

A player wins once he or she has generated enough tau to open a portal with which to ascend to Heaven.

Card size
While the vast majority of CCGs adhered to the standard ISO 216 B8 card size of 2.5" x 3.5", popularized by playing cards and the pioneering CCG Magic: The Gathering, Heresy was notable for instead using oversized cards with a much greater height. The similarity of the height to that of tarot cards emphasized the magical and mystical themes of the card game. The greater card size also allowed for larger art. On the other hand, the greater size was criticized for rendering the cards unable to fit in standard-sized card sleeves, as well as making shuffling difficult.

Art
The larger card size showcased art by such well-known artists as Tim Bradstreet, Gerald Brom, Michael W. Kaluta, Tom Kidd, James O'Barr, Andrew Robinson, Barclay Shaw, John K. Snyder III, Karl Waller, and Bernie Wrightson.

Reception
Steve Faragher reviewed Heresy for Arcane magazine, rating it an 8 out of 10 overall. Faragher comments that "Heresy is a wonderful game that proves that startlingly original atmosphere is just as important as innovative mechanics in CCG."

Reviews
Review in Shadis #23

Further reading
Overview in Scrye #9

References

External links
 Heresy: Kingdom Come BoardGameGeek Reviews
 Heresy: Kingdom Come Frother Brothers UK Website
 Heresy: Kingdom Come SFKO Website
 Heresy: Kingdom Come in Google Group
 Heresy: Kingdom Come Virtual Spud Website 
Preview in Scrye #8

Card games introduced in 1995
Collectible card games
Last Unicorn Games games
War in Heaven
Angels in popular culture
Demons in popular culture